Percus villae is a species of beetles in the family Carabidae.

Distribution
This species is endemic to southwestern Alps of France and Italy.

References

Pterostichinae
Beetles described in 1858